Razajerdi is a moribund Northwestern Iranian language closely related to Talysh.

References 

Northwestern Iranian languages